Cerro Pachón  (Spanish for "Pachón hill") is a mountain located close to the Chilean city of Vicuña and 10 km southeast of the Cerro Tololo Inter-American Observatory, at an altitude of 2,715 m above sea level in the foothills of the Andes. The location is exceedingly dry, making it suitable for infrared observations. The air overhead is very stable, yielding excellent visualization/seeing. During the summer months, Cerro Pachón is often above the haze layer that can envelop lower altitudes.

There are currently two telescopes commissioned on Cerro Pachón, Gemini South and the Southern Astrophysical Research Telescope. A third, the Vera C. Rubin Observatory, is under construction.

Gallery

See also
 List of astronomical observatories

References

External links
 Cerro Pachon
 Cerro Pachon, Chile (The Southern Gemini Telescope)

Pachon
Astronomical observatories in Chile
Pachon